Kärt Johanson (born 8 November 1971) is an Estonian singer and actor.

She was born in Tallinn. In 1997 she graduated from Estonian Institute of Humanities.

She is one of the founder members of the theatre foundation Theatrum (established in 1994).

As a singer, she has been a member of musical group Johanson & Vennad. She has also sung together with Tõnis Mägi.

Since 2001 she is married to singer Tõnis Mägi. The couple have two daughters.

Discography
 Päevakera. Globus Diei, with Johanson (CD and cassette, 2000)
 Seitse une nägu (CD, 2004)
 Unistadt (CD, 2007)
 Külm, koos Johansonidega (CD, 2012)
 Teine ruum, with Tõnis Mägi (CD, 2012)

References

Living people
1971 births
20th-century Estonian women singers
21st-century Estonian women singers
Estonian stage actresses
20th-century Estonian actresses
21st-century Estonian actresses
Singers from Tallinn